This category is for non-Israeli footballers who currently play or have played in any of the Israeli leagues.  The list includes also players that earned Israeli nationality during the years since being Jewish or marrying an Israeli wife.

European

Albania 
Valon Ahmedi
Adrian Aliaj
Elis Bakaj
Elvin Beqiri
Jahmir Hyka
Sabien Lilaj
Viktor Paço
Besnik Prenga
Hamdi Salihi
Henry Emenalo

Armenia 
Hamlet Mkhitaryan
Arthur Petrosyan
Armen Shahgeldyan
Yeghia Yavruyan

Austria 
Sandro Gotal
Egon Pollak
Lukas Spendlhofer

Azerbaijan 
Shahin Diniyev
Aleksandr Zhidkov

Belarus 
Andrey Astrowski
Ivan Bakhar
Syarhyey Hyerasimets
Alyaksandr Karnitsky
Yevgeni Kashentsev
Georgi Kondratyev
Vital Lyadzyanyow
Denis Polyakov
Ilya Shkurin
Yuri Shukanov
Maksim Skavysh
Raman Vasilyuk

Belgium 
Samy Bourard
Dylan Damraoui
David Hubert
Jérémie Luvovadio
Pieter Mbemba
Pieter Merlier
Geoffrey Mujangi Bia
Marvin Peersman
Rubenilson
Elisha Sam
Dylan Seys
Marc Van Der Linden
Dries Wuytens

Bosnia and Herzegovina 
Semir Bajraktarević
Jasmin Burić
Edin Cocalić
Enes Demirović
Ibrahim Duro
Sead Halilović
Emir Hadžić
Selver Hodžić
Admir Hasančić
Ivan Jolić
Meho Kodro
Haris Medunjanin
Adi Mehremić
Jasmin Mujdža
Asmir Suljić
Tino-Sven Sušić
Adnan Zahirović
Nedžad Žerić

Bulgaria 
Vladimir Andonov
Krasimir Bezinski
Krum Bibishkov
Georgi Borisov
Atanas Bornosuzov
Nikolay Dyulgerov
Plamen Galabov
Viktor Genev
Kostadin Hazurov
Georgi Kostadinov
Dimitar Makriev
Ivaylo Markov
Danail Mitev
Atanas Pashev
Martin Raynov
Dimitar Telkiyski
Igor Tomašić
Elin Topuzakov
Emil Velev
Bozhidar Vasev
Dimitar Rangelov

Croatia 
Michael Aničić
Mario Babić
Dražen Bagarić
Tomo Barlecaj
Mate Baturina
Joško Bilić
Miroslav Bičanić
Elvis Brajković
Karlo Bručić
Jurica Buljat
Tomislav Bušić
Mario Čižmek
Marko Ćosić
Antonini Čulina
Tomislav Erceg
Nino Galović
Hrvoje Ilić
Josip Ivančić
Domagoj Kosić
Filip Jazvić
Vedran Ješe
Igor Jovanović
Hrvoje Kovačević
Miljenko Kovačić
Ivica Kulešević
Mate Lacić
Damir Lazek
Siniša Linić
Stipe Matić
Mario Meštrović
Goran Milanko
Igor Mostarlić
Antonio Mršić
Jasmin Mujdža
Mario Musa
Mirko Oremuš
Mario Osibov
Stipe Perica
Nenad Pralija
Miroslav Pejić
Borimir Perković
Ante Puljić
Dejan Radonjić
Darko Raic-Sudar
Zoran Rajović
Danijel Romić
Giovanni Rosso
Davor Rupnik
Luka Sindić
Dino Škvorc
Željko Sopić
Damir Šovšić
Dino Štiglec
Robert Tezacki
Igor Tomašić
Dinko Trebotić
Stefan Věrnaiş
Branko Vrgoč
Zlatko Čajkovski
Silvije Čavlina
Dario Zahora

Cyprus 
Savva Georgiou
Constantinos Soteriou

Czech Republic 
Ondřej Bačo
Radovan Hromádko
Přemysl Kovář
Lubomír Kubica
Jaroslav Ložek
Tomáš Pekhart
Pavel Pergl
Tomáš Sivok
Kamil Vacek
Pavel Zavadil
Martin Zeman

England 
Morgan Ferrier
Jamie Hopcutt
James Keene
Junior Ogedi-Uzokwe

Finland 
Mika Aaltonen
Erfan Zeneli

France 
Jonathan Assous
Johan Audel
Georges Ba
Jean-Sylvain Babin
Franck-Yves Bambock
Cédric Bardon
Dylan Batubinsika
Julien Cétout
Steven Cohen
Pierre Cornud
Siramana Dembélé
Fabrice Fernandes
Jordan Faucher
Romain Habran
Maxime Josse
Yannick Kamanan
Jérôme Leroy
Mickaël Marsiglia
Johan Martial
Teddy Mézague
Carmelo Micciche
Sacha Petshi
Vamara Sanogo
Mohamadou Sissoko
Amadou Soukouna
Grégory Tadé
Kevin Tapoko
Xavier Tomas
Mamadou Wagué

Georgia 
Giorgi Anchabadze
Shota Babunashvili
Giorgi Chelidze
Giorgi Daraselia
Davit Dighmelashvili
Vladimir Dvalishvili
Akaki Devadze
Giorgi Demetradze
Givi Didava
Giorgi Gabidauri
Iuri Gabiskiria
Giorgi Gakhokidze
Irakli Geperidze
Kakhaber Gogichaishvili
Revaz Gotsiridze
Levan Khmaladze
Levan Khomeriki
Georgi Kipiani
Davit Kizilashvili
Levan Kutalia
Zurab Menteshashvili
Gela Panchulidze
Amiran Mujiri
Klimenti Tsitaishvili
Irakli Zoidze

Germany 
Erich Berko
Manuel Bölstler
Florian Hartherz
Marcel Heister
Tim Heubach
Francis Kioyo
Christopher Mandiangu
Julian Reinard
Elia Soriano

Gibraltar 
Liam Walker

Greece 
Giannis Anestis
Stefanos Athanasiadis
Timis Bardis
Dimitris Diamantakos
Andreas Gianniotis
Sotiris Ninis
Yiannis Papadopoulos
Thanasis Papazoglou
Loukas Vyntra

Hungary 
István Emori
Dénes Eszenyi
Gábor Halmai
István Hamar
Ferenc Horváth
Dávid Kelemen
Mihály Korhut
Márk Koszta
Gábor Marton
Géza Mészöly
István Pisont
István Salloi
Vilmos Sebők
Tamás Sándor
Ádám Vezér
Zoltán Végh
László Czéh
Viktor Mundi
Tibor Sallai
Tibor Balogh
Tamás Priskin
Janos Tomka
Győrgy Veber
Richárd Vernes
Zoltan Nagy

Iceland 
Hólmar Örn Eyjólfsson
Viðar Örn Kjartansson

Italy 
Cristian Battocchio
Davide Petrucci

Kazakhstan 
Vladimir Niederhaus

Kosovo 
Enis Alushi
Florent Hasani
Alban Pnishi
Astrit Selmani

Latvia 
Andrejs Prohorenkovs
Mihails Zemļinskis

Lithuania 
Džiugas Bartkus
Martynas Dapkus
Edvinas Girdvainis
Kęstutis Ivaškevičius
Tadas Kijanskas
Arvydas Novikovas
Mindaugas Panka
Robertas Poškus
Eimantas Poderis
Darvydas Šernas
Ernestas Šetkus
Domantas Šimkus
Vyacheslav Sukristov
Nerijus Valskis
Emilijus Zubas
Raimondas Žutautas
Irmantas Zelmikas

Malta 
Joseph Mbong

North Macedonia 
Igor Gjuzelov
Boban Grnčarov
Gjorgji Hristov
Igor Jančevski
Igor Mitreski
Risto Mitrevski
Žarko Serafimovski
Stefan Spirovski
Milan Stojanovski
Vančo Trajanov
Miroslav Vajs

Moldova 
Igor Andronic
Serghei Clescenco
Artur Crăciun
Radu Gînsari
Igor Kostrov
Nichita Moțpan
Ion Nicolaescu
Alexandru Suharev

Montenegro 
Fatos Bećiraj
Aleksandar Boljević
Đorđije Ćetković
Stefan Denković
Nikola Drinčić
Duško Đurišić
Vladimir Gluščević
Marko Janković
Dragoslav Jevrić
Boris Kopitović
Žarko Korać
Stefan Milošević
Savo Pavićević
Aleksandar Šćekić
Marko Simić

Netherlands 
Elton Acolatse
Erik Hroliken
Glynor Plet
Daniël de Ridder
John de Wolf
Derrick Luckassen
Etiënne Reijnen
Godfried Roemeratoe
Fabian Sporkslede
Kevin Tano
Arsenio Valpoort
Kellian van der Kaap
Piet Velthuizen

Norway
Akinshola Akinyemi
Fitim Azemi

Poland 
Jarosław Araszkiewicz
Jarosław Bako
Jerzy Brzęczek
Tomasz Cebula
Marek Citko
Dariusz Dźwigała
Remigiusz Jezierski
Patryk Klimala
Andrzej Kubica
Stefan Machaj
Radosław Majdan
Radosław Michalski
Kazimierz Moskal
Ludovic Obraniak
Tomasz Sokołowski I
Łukasz Surma
Grzegorz Szamotulski
Jerzy Vavra
Grzegorz Wędzyński
Marcin Włodarczyk

Portugal 
Bernardo Vasconcelos
Tiago Costa
Ricardo Fernandes
André Geraldes
Rui Lima
Hélder Lopes
Bruno Luz
André Martins
Rúben Micael
Jorge Teixeira
Josué
Josué Sá
Miguel Silva
Bruno Pinheiro
Orlando Sá
Adrien Silva
David Simão
Afonso Taira
Diogo Verdasca
Rafael Victor
Miguel Vítor

Republic Of Ireland 
Cillian Sheridan

Romania 
Florin Achim
Angelo Alistar
Liviu Antal
Mihai Antal
Bogdan Apostu
Mircea Axente
Marian Bâcu
Ovidiu Bic
Dan Bucșa
Laurențiu Buș
Claudiu Bumba
Zeno Bundea
Marian Calafeteanu
Gheorghe Ceaușilă
Marius Cheregi
Ovidiu Cuc
Cristian Dănălache
Cristian Daminuţă
Daniel Dumitrescu
Adrian Găman
Gabriel Giurgiu
Adrian Grigoruţă
Dorin Goga
Ion Goanță
Ovidiu Hoban
Adrian Hurdubei
Costel Lazăr
Gheorghe Liliac
Dănuţ Lupu
Andrei Lungu
Ioan Marcu
Alin Minteuan
Lică Movilă
Dănuț Moisescu
Cătălin Necula
Bogdan Nicolae
Robert Niță
Emil Ninu
Marian Pană
Corneliu Papură
Dănuţ Perjă
Mihai Pintilii
Adrian Pitu
Florin Purece
Mihai Roman
Alin Rus
Cristian Sârghi
Daniel Scînteie
Dorin Semeghin
Costel Solomon
Ilie Stan
Adrian Ungur
Gabriel Tamaș
Viorel Tănase
Valentin Teodorica
Marius Todericiu
Eugen Trică
Constantin Vizonic
Gabriel Vochin
Mihai Voduț
Samir Zamfir

Russia 
Georgi Batyayev
Sergei Borodin
Sergey Dmitriev
Stanislav Dubrovin
Vladimir Grechnev
Vasili Ivanov
Valeri Kleimyonov
Sergei Kolotovkin
Aleksei Kosolapov
Mykola Kudrytsky
Oleg Malyukov
Boris Matveyev
Murad Megamadov
Vyacheslav Melnikov
Grigori Morozov
Ruslan Nigmatullin
German Onugkha
Mikhail Osinov
Sergei Podpaly
Zaur Sadayev
Dzhabrail Kadiyev
Aleksandr Podshivalov
Aleksandr Polukarov
Dmitri Popov
Magomed-Shapi Suleymanov
Aleksey Shchigolev
Andrey Tikhonov
Dmitri Ulyanov
Aleksandr Uvarov
Oleg Yelyshev

Serbia 
Marko Adamović
Nenad Adamović
Miodrag Anđelković
Milan Bojović
Lazar Ćirković
Nikola Ćirković
Srđan Čolaković
Nenad Cvetković
Aleksandar Davidov
Darko Drinić
Nikola Gulan
Dejan Ilić
Ivica Iliev
Saša Ivković
Dragoslav Jevrić
Branislav Jovanović
Đorđe Jovanović
Lazar Jovanović
Marko Jovanović
Aleksandar Jović
Filip Knežević
Vladimir Kožul
Matija Ljujić
Nenad Markičević
Marko Markovski
Milan Martinović
Dušan Matović
Branko Mihajlović
Svetozar Mijin
Nikola Mitrović
Miljan Mrdaković
Fejsal Mulić
Uroš Nikolić
Nemanja Petrović
Bogdan Planić
Miloš Radivojević
Predrag Rajković
Aleksandar Rakić
Bojan Šaranov
Aleksandar Šarić
Branko Savić
Zlatan Šehović
Slobodan Simović
Aleksandar Stanisavljević
Slaviša Stojanović
Vladimir Stojković
Nikola Valentić
Nemanja Vučićević
Ivan Vukomanović
Igor Zlatanović

Slovakia 
Stanislav Angelovič
Martin Fěşko
Tomáš Košický
Jozef Kostelník
Jaroslav Mihalik
Roman Pivarník
Erik Sabo
Jakub Sylvestr
Július Szöke

Slovenia 
Miran Burgić
Nastja Čeh
Sebastjan Cimirotič
Darko Djukič
Damjan Gajser
Primož Gliha
Amer Jukan
David Poljanec
Vladimir Kokol
Andrej Komac
Darijan Matić
Miha Mevlja
Rene Mihelič
Mitja Mörec
Milan Osterc
Alen Ožbolt
Jalen Pokorn
Ermin Rakovič
Simon Sešlar
Dalibor Stevanovič
Klemen Šturm
Sandi Valentinčič
Adnan Zildžović

Spain 
David Aganzo
Jorge Alonso
Jair Amador
Pablo Buendía
Albert Crusat
Carlos Cuéllar
Isaac Cuenca
Adrián Fernández
Carlos García
Gonzalo García
Román Golobart
Pablo González
Luis Hernández
Borja Herrera González
Javi González
Marc Fernández
Cristian Hidalgo
Pablo de Lucas
Lillo
Juan Pablo
Mané
Miguel Marcos Madera
David Mateos
Aitor Monroy
Jorge Morcillo
Sergio Novoa
Abraham Paz
Rubén Rayos
José Rodríguez
Jesús Rueda
Enric Saborit
Marc Valiente
Míchel
Jonathan Vila

Sweden 
Rade Prica
Rasmus Sjöstedt
Daniel Sundgren

Switzerland 
Nenad Savić
Fabian Stoller

Turkey 
Kerim Frei

Ukraine 
Andriy Bal
Serhiy Balanchuk
Anton Bratkov
Vladimir Bessonov
Viktor Chanov
Oleksandr Haidash
Ivan Hetsko
Serhiy Kandaurov
Vasiliy Kardash
Vitaliy Komarnitskyy
Serhiy Konovalov
Oleksandr Kosyrin
Mykola Kudrytsky
Oleh Kuznetsov
Ruslan Liubarskyi
Viktor Moroz
Dmytro Mykhailenko
Oleg Naduda
Oleksandr Noyok
Denys Onyshchenko
Gennadiy Perepadenko
Roman Pets
Roman Pilipchuk
Andriy Pylyavskyi
Dmytro Ryzhuk
Bohdan Sarnavskyi
Oleksandr Stetsenko
Yuri Tarasov
Serhiy Tretyak
Vadym Tyshchenko
Ivan Yaremchuk
Oleksandr Zhdanov
Hennadiy Zhylkin

African

Angola
Evandro Brandão
Dolly Menga

Benin 
Tony Toklomety

Burkina Faso
Issoumaila Lingane

Cameroon 
Rodrigue Bongongui
Yves Djida
Emmanuel Emangoa
Ernest Etchi
Gaël Etock
Jeando Fuchs
Francis Kioyo
Wato Kuaté
Zome Louis
Ernest Mabouka
Cyril Makanaky
Yannick Makota
Georges Mandjeck
Joslain Mayebi
Aka Adek Mba
Émile Mbamba
Ariel Ngueukam
David Nyengue
Augustine Simo
Patrick Suffo
Bernard Tchoutang
Dominique Wassi

Central African Republic 
Habib Habibou
David Manga

Chad
Ezechiel N'Douassel

Côte d'Ivoire 
Stephane Acka
Serge Ayeli
Georges Ba
Mohammed Bamba
Zie Yohou Boris
Didier Brossou
Jonathan Cissé
Eugène Dadi
Lassina Dao
Joël Damahou
Mohammed Diallo
Alfa Mamadou Diané
Abou Dosso
Thierry Doubai
Aboubacar Junior Doumbia
Sékou Doumbia
Steve Gohouri
Jean-Jacques Gosso
Fernand Gouré
Tchiressoua Guel
Parfait Guiagon
Koni Jakreta
Yao Eloge Koffi
Yaya Kone
Doueugui Mala
Yaya Meledje
Ulrich Meleke
Edgar Paul
Moussa Sanogo
Senin Sebai
Ismaila Soro
William Togui
Aristide Benoit Zogbo

Congo DR 
Mbala Mbuta Biscotte
Jordan Botaka
Ngasanya Ilongo
Jean-Claude Kabeya Mukanya
Hervé Kage
Papi Kimoto
Fabrice Lokembo-Lokaso
Saïd Makasi
Harrison Manzala
Alain Masudi
Nsumbu Mazuwa
Camille Muzinga
M'peti Nimba
Tcham N'Toya
Jeff Tutuana
Ibbos Yuveladio

Republic of Congo 
Clévid Dikamona
Ramaric Etou
Bernard Onanga Itoua
Paty Yeye Lenkebe
Savity Lipenia
Yves Pambou
Mavis Tchibota

Gabon 
Paul Kessany
Gilchrist Nguema

Gambia 
Jarjue Abdoulie
Pa Omar Babou
Robert Badjie
Abubakar Barry
Hamza Barry
Momodou Ceesay
Joof Gaira
Omar Gaye
Tijan Jaiteh
Ken Jammeh
Modou Jobe
Njie Kabaha
Ousman Marong
Ebou Sillah
Kabba Sonko
Saikou Touray

Equatorial Guinea 
Juan Epitié
Thierry Fidjeu-Tazemeta

Ghana 
Karim Abubakar
David Acquah
Richmond Boakye
Richard Gadze
Edwin Gyasi
Adamu Mohammed
Ibrahim Abdul Razak
Daniel Addo
Ishmael Addo
Sammy Adjei
Kwabena Agouda
Samuel Alabi
Aziz Ansah
Eugene Ansah
Latif Amadu
William Amamoo
Ibrahim Atiku
Samed Abdul Awudu
Emmanuel Banahene
Osman Bashiru
Ibrahim Bassit
Emanuel Bentil
James Bissue
Derek Boateng
Emmanuel Boateng
Richard Boateng
Yussif Chibsah
Bernard Dong Bortey
Godsway Donyoh
Emmanuel Duah
Mark Edusei
Kweku Essien
Mohammed Gado
Eric Gawu
Montari Kamaheni
Kwame Karikari
Laryea Kingston
Gershon Koffie
Francis Kyeremeh
Imoro Lukman
Ebenezer Mamatah
Philemon McCarthy
Alfred Mensah
Joseph Mensah
Nelson Mensah
Abdul Zakaria Mugees
Divine Naah
Cletus Nombil
Issac Nortey
Stephen Ofei
Peter Ofori-Quaye
Okocha
Prince Okraku
Ransford Osei
Leonard Owusu
John Paintsil
Emmanuel Pappoe
Isaac Pappoe
Elvis Sakyi
Joseph Tachie
Patrick Twumasi
Charles Vardis
Abubakari Yahuza
Samuel Yeboah

Guinea 
Gideon Akuowua
Mohamed Aly Camara
Pathé Bangoura
Hadji Barry
Demba Camara
Kémoko Camara
Kerfala Cissoko
Sékou Condé
Antoine Conte
Ibrahima Conté
Keita Karamokoba
Alhassane Keita
Kamso Mara
Richard Soumah
Seydouba Soumah
Mohamed Kalil Traoré

Guinea Bissau 
Francisco Júnior
Dionísio Fernandes Mendes
João Jaquité
Sambinha

Kenya 
Jamal Mohammed
Patrick Osiako

Liberia 
Amos Kollie
George Baysah
Victor Carr
Prince Daye
Patrick Doeplah
George Gebro
Dulee Johnson
Mohammed Kamara
James Koko Lomell
Allen Njie
Terrence Tisdell
David Tweh

Madagascar 
Anicet Abel

Mali 
Moussa Bagayoko
Djibril Sidibé

Mauritius 
Willy Vincent

Niger
Koffi Dan Kowa
Moussa Maâzou
Ali Mohamed
Yussif Moussa

Nigeria 
Aliyu Adam
Sodiq Atanda
Najib Yussuf Abdul
Omar Abdul Aziz
Ismail Abdul Razak
Oluwasegun Abiodun
Olubayo Adefemi
Adebayo Adeleye
James Adeniyi
William Agada
Olomuyiva Aganun
Edith Agoye
Dele Aiyenugba
Goodness Ajayi
George Akpabio
Steven Alfred
Michael Amanga
Efe Ambrose
Austin Amutu
Izuchukwu Anthony
Eugene Ansah
Sunday Ayumi
Magalan Ugochukwu Awala
Taye Babalola
Aliko Bala
Marcus Bastos
Yero Bello
John Chibuike
George Datoru
Emmanuel Ebiede
Anderson Ebimo West
Ekigho Ehiosun
Austin Ejide
Eric Ejiofor
Caleb Ekwenugo
Blessing Eleke
Michael Emenalo
Vincent Enyeama
Anthony Eviparker
Odeni George
Fred Friday
Bruno Ibeh
Shuaibu Ibrahim
Nosa Igiebor
Harmony Ikande
Philip Ipole
Ekundayo Jayeoba
Benjamin Kuku
Pascal Kondaponi
Anthony Lukusa
Henry Makinwa
Odah Marshall
Chimezie Mbah
Ibrahim Muhammad
Jacob Njoku
Joseph Nwafor
Anthony Nwakaeme
Peter Nworah
Jude Nworuh
Atonye Nyingifa
Nathan Oduwa
Chikeluba Ofoedu
Ibezito Ogbonna
John Ogu
Uche Okafor
Michael Olaha
Aaron Samuel Olanare
Peter Olawale
Thompson Oliha
Michael Omoh
Harrison Omoko
Sunny Omoregie
Peter Onyekachi
Femi Opabunmi
Bede Osuji
Patrick Ovie
Sunday Rotimi
Uche Sherif
Hamed Sholaja
Stephen Sunday
Samson Siasia
Michael Tukura
Muhammed Usman
Ikouwem Utin
Ugwu Uzochukwu
Yakubu

Rwanda 
Saïd Makasi

Senegal 
Olivier Boissy
Issa Cissokho
Romuald da Costa
Cheikh Gadiaga
Moussa Konaté
Ablaye Mbengue
Abdoulaye Seck
Gora Tall
Mamadou Touré Thiam
Boubacar Traorè

Sierra Leone 
Alpha Conteh
Kwame Quee
Emmanuel Samadia

South Africa 
Thembinkosi Fanteni
Bevan Fransman
Tsepo Masilela
Mihlali Mayambela
Dino Ndlovu
Siyabonga Nkosi
Zama Rambuwane
Siyanda Xulu

Swaziland 
John Mdluli

Tanzania 
Novatus Dismas

Togo 
Eric Akoto
Arafat Djako
Didier Kougbenya
Emmanuel Mathias

Uganda 
Timothy Awany
Fahad Bayo
Luwagga Kizito

Zambia 
Lameck Banda
Francis Kasonde
Rodgers Kola
Conlyde Luchanga
Emmanuel Mayuka
Emmanuel Mbola
William Njovu
Chaswe Nsofwa
Ngosa Sunzu
Fwayo Tembo
Junstine Zulu

Zimbabwe 
Wilfred Mugeyi
Energy Murambadoro

South American

Argentina 
Andrés Ricardo Aimar
Hector Almandoz
Pablo Bastianini
Christian Berera
Pablo Brandán
Ignacio Canuto
Roberto Colautti
Diego Crosa
Pablo del Rio
Cristian Fabbiani
Dario Fernandez
Gustavo Fuentes
Marcos Galarza
Nicolás Gorobsov
Guillermo Israilevich
Pedro Joaquín Galván
Oscar Garré
Bryan Gerzicich
Alejandro Kenig
René Lima
Fernando Lorefice
Marcelo Meli
Beto Naveda
Carlos Olaran
Víctor Ormazábal
Javier Páez
Fabio Pieters
Gastón Sangoy
Óscar Scarione

Brazil 
Abedi
Allyson
André Caldeira
Adilson Bahia
Roger Bernardo
Bianor
Gustavo Boccoli
Breitner Morte de Carvalho
Bruno Andrade
Bruno
Bruno Reis
Bryan
Cadu
Caio
Jefisley André Caldeira
Capone
Claudemir
Claudir
Daniel
Danilo
David Gomez
Marcelo Toscano
Marcus Diniz
Dos Santos
Douglas da Silva
Dudu Cearense
Eduardo Marques
Elivelto
Fábio Júnior
Fabrício
Fabrício Silva Dornellas
Farley
Bernardo Frizoni
Gabriel Lima
Mateus Lima
Gabriel Santos
Gian
Georginho
Lucas Gaúcho
Guti
Heidor
Humberto Foguinho
Indio
Joeano
José Duarte
Josue Gomes
Júlio César
Julio César da Silva
Leandro
Leandro Costa Miranda Moraes
Leandro Simioni
Lira
Luanderson
Lucas Salinas
Jonatan Lucca
Maicon
Lúcio Maranhão
Marcelo
Márcio Giovanini
Marcos Paulo Alves
Marquinhos
Matheusinho
Mauricio
Gustavo Marmentini
Nivaldo
Paulinho
Pedro Sass
Rafael Jataí
Renan
Rodrigo António
Romário Pires
Ramalho
Ramon
Renato
Rômulo
Farley Vieira Rosa
Rubenilson
Santos Washington
Schwenck
Lucas Serafim
Silas
Siston
Juliano Spadacio
Bruno Soares
Tales Schutz
Michael Thuíque
Tiago Dutra
Tuto
Higor Vidal
Wanderson
Wellington
Wescley Gonçalves
Wigor
William Soares
Xavier
Xavier Dirceu
Willie

Bolivia 
Carlos Arias
Miguel Hoyos
Ronald Raldes
Guillermo Vizcarra
Nicolás Tauber

Chile 
Cristián Álvarez
Mauricio Aros
Pedro Campos
Rodrigo Goldberg
Manuel Iturra
Milovan Mirosevic
Manuel Neira
Rafael Olarra
Sebastián Rozental

Colombia 
Jonathan Agudelo
Danilo Asprilla
Jorge López Caballero
Carlos Ceballos
John Jairo Culma
Iván Garrido
Oswaldo Henríquez
Carlos Rivas

Ecuador 
Marlon de Jesús

Paraguay 
Aldo Adorno
Jorge Brítez
Roberto Fabian Sanchez Doldan
Dante López
Santiago Ocampos

Peru 
Jair Céspedes
Miguel Cevasco
Paolo de la Haza
Junior Viza

Uruguay 
Sebastián Abreu
Edgardo Adinolfi
Cristian González Aidinovich
Martín Alaniz
Joe Bizera
Gary Kagelmacher
Claudio Milar
Claudio Rivero
Felipe Jorge Rodríguez

Venezuela 
Carlos Espinoza
Josua Mejías
Andrés Túñez

Central America and Caribbean

Costa Rica 
Jimmy Marín
Luis Marín
John Jairo Ruiz

Curaçao 
Brandley Kuwas
Darryl Lachman

Guadeloupe 
Mickaël Alphonse
Ange-Freddy Plumain

Guyana 
Emery Welshman

Jamaica 
Peter Cargill
Dennis Chin
Paul Davis
Maalique Foster
Kevaughn Frater
Dane Kelly
Michael Seaton
Newton Sterling

Panama 
Abdiel Arroyo
Alberto Blanco
Omar Browne
Davis Contreras
Armando Cooper
Armando Dely Valdés
Eduardo Guerrero
Alberto Zapata

Suriname 
Tjaronn Chery
Nigel Hasselbaink
Touvarno Pinas
Gleofilo Vlijter
Yanic Wildschut

Trinidad and Tobago 
Levi Garcia
Scott Sealy

Asian

Australia 
Scott Higgins
Nikita Rukavytsya
Trent Sainsbury
Ryan Strain

Japan 
Takuya Murayama

Kyrgyzstan 
Mirlan Murzaev

Turkmenistan 
Sergey Agashkov
Valeri Broshin
Andrei Zavyalov

Uzbekistan 
Igor Shkvyrin

North American

Canada 
Tomer Chencinski
Daniel Haber
Milovan Kapor
Tosaint Ricketts

Haiti 
Djimy Alexis
Carnejy Antoine
Frantzdy Pierrot

United States 
Hamisi Amani-Dove
George Fochive
Bryan Gerzicich

Oceania

New Zealand
Stefan Marinovic

Israel
 
Foreign
Association football player non-biographical articles